Kozolupy may refer to:

in the Czech Republic
Kozolupy (Plzeň-North District), a village in the Plzeň Region
Horní Kozolupy, a village in Tachov District in the Plzeň Region

in Poland
Kozołupy, a village in Masovian Voivodeship